The Desperate Ones or Beyond the Mountains (Spanish: Más allá de las montañas) is a 1967 American-Spanish dramatic adventure film directed by Alexander Ramati and starring Maximilian Schell, Irene Papas and Raf Vallone.

Plot
Following the Nazi-Soviet Pact in 1939 and the subsequent invasion of Poland, two brothers are sent to the gulag in Siberia. They manage to escape and undertake an epic attempt to make it to the border with Afghanistan.

Cast
 Maximilian Schell as Marek 
 Irene Papas as Ajmi 
 Raf Vallone as Victor 
 Theodore Bikel as Kisielev 
 Maria Perschy as Marusia 
 Fernando Rey as Ibram 
 George Voskovec as Doctor 
 Alberto de Mendoza as Hamlat 
  as Ulug Beg 
 Vicente Sangiovanni as Shura 
 Boyd Holister as Ukrainian NKVD 
 Danny Steinmann as NKVD Guard 
 Mariela Chatlak as Aka 
 Carmen Carbonell as Ulug Beg's Wife

See also
The Way Back (2010)

References

Bibliography
 Goble, Alan. The Complete Index to Literary Sources in Film. Walter de Gruyter, 1999.

External links

1967 films
Spanish adventure films
1967 adventure films
American adventure films
1960s English-language films
Films shot in Spain
Films directed by Alexander Ramati
Films set in the 1940s
Films set in the Soviet Union
Films about the Soviet Union in the Stalin era
1960s American films
Works about the Gulag
Films set in Siberia